Here is the discography of the English new wave band ABC.

Studio albums

Live albums

Compilation albums

Charting compilation albums

Complete list of compilation albums
 1988 The Suberbs of Alphabet City (Japan only release)
 1990 Absolutely
 1991 Fantastic Compositions (4x CD box set, Japan only release)
 1992 ABC 1 (UK only release)
 1992 ABC 2 (UK only release)
 1993 Tears Are Not Enough (Germany only release)
 1993 The Remix Collection (UK only release) 
 1996 The Collection (Re-issued in 1998 as The Look of Love)
 1997 Master Series
 1999 Classic ABC
 2000 One Better World (Germany only release)
 2000 The Best of ABC: 20th Century Masters – The Millennium Collection (US release only)
 2000 ABC Best – The Look of Love (Germany only release)
 2000 Hello! An Introduction To ABC
 2001 The Look of Love (Re-issued in 2002 as Poison Arrow)
 2001 Look of Love – The Very Best of ABC
 2004 The Ultimate Collection
 2006 ABC Gold
 2007 Never More Than Now – The ABC Collection (Europe only release)
 2016 The Box Inside The Box (Vinyl and DVD box set)
 2020 The Essential ABC

Singles

External links

References

Discography
Discographies of British artists
Pop music group discographies
New wave discographies